Alice in Dairyland is a program that is meant to promote Wisconsin's diverse agriculture industry. A young woman is selected every year to be Wisconsin's Agriculture Ambassador. As a contracted public relations specialist, she works with the media, educates the public, speaks with rural and urban audiences, and teaches students about all aspects of the Wisconsin agricultural industry. 

The program began as the Dairy Queen program in 1934, and was renamed to Alice in Dairyland in 1948. It is organized by the Wisconsin Department of Agriculture, Trade, and Consumer Protection (DATCP) and headquartered in Madison.

Winners

Source:

References

Further reading

External links
 Official website
 Alice in Dairyland at the Wisconsin Department of Agriculture, Trade and Consumer Protection
 Alice in Dairyland historical artifacts at the Wisconsin Historical Society

Wisconsin culture
Culture of Madison, Wisconsin
Women in Wisconsin